This is a list of heads of government of the Democratic People's Republic of Angola. Angola is a country in southern Africa bordered by Namibia on the south, the Democratic Republic of the Congo on the north, and Zambia on the east; its west coast is on the Atlantic Ocean. Since the adoption of a new constitution, early in 2010, the politics of Angola takes place in a framework of a presidential republic, whereby the President of Angola is both head of state and head of government, and of a multi-party system. Executive power is exercised by the government. Legislative power is vested in the President, the government and parliament.

Affiliations

See also

Angola
Heads of state of Angola
Heads of government of Angola
Colonial heads of Angola
Heads of state of the Democratic People's Republic of Angola
Lists of office-holders

Political history of Angola
1975 in Angola
1976 in Angola
Government of Angola